The Women's discus throw F40 event for les autres (athletes with dwarfism) was held at the 2004 Summer Paralympics in the Athens Olympic Stadium. It was won by Enna Ben Abidi, representing .

24 Sept. 2004, 10:45

References

W
2004 in women's athletics